Ruby Mountains National Forest was established as the Ruby Mountains Forest Reserve by the U.S. Forest Service in the Ruby Mountains of northeastern Nevada on May 3, 1906 with . It became a National Forest on March 4, 1907. On July 1, 1908 the entire forest was added to Humboldt National Forest and the name was discontinued until Ruby National Forest was established from Humboldt in 1912. The lands are presently part of the Ruby Mountain District of Humboldt-Toiyabe National Forest.

The forest was administered from the Gold Creek Ranger Station from 1911-to 1916, which has been listed on the National Register of Historic Places.

References

External links 

 Forest History Society
 Listing of the National Forests of the United States and Their Dates (from the Forest History Society website) Text from Davis, Richard C., ed. Encyclopedia of American Forest and Conservation History. New York: Macmillan Publishing Company for the Forest History Society, 1983. Vol. II, pp. 743-788.

Ruby Mountains
Former National Forests of Nevada
Protected areas of Elko County, Nevada
Protected areas of White Pine County, Nevada
Humboldt–Toiyabe National Forest
1907 establishments in Nevada
Protected areas established in 1907
1908 disestablishments in Nevada
Protected areas disestablished in 1908